Galović is a village in Serbia. It is situated in the Koceljeva municipality, in the Mačva District of Central Serbia. In 2002, the village had a population of 235, all of whom were Serbian.

Historical population

1948: 460
1953: 476
1961: 426
1971: 413
1981: 345
1991: 264
2002: 235

References

See also
List of places in Serbia

Populated places in Mačva District